Shriro Group is a private company headquartered in Hong Kong. It is an international marketing and distribution company with over 3,500 employees around the world.

Shriro was founded in 1906 as a family business in Harbin, Northern China. The first international office was set up in 1917 in Yokohama, Japan. From the early days, the business was mainly commodities and expanded rapidly after 1945 as the product line expanded and new subsidiaries opened in many South East Asian countries and Canada.

Today, Shriro offices are located in Hong Kong, China, Japan, Singapore, Malaysia, Taiwan, Thailand, Vietnam, Australia, and New Zealand.

Shriro is a major distributor of medium-format camera equipment in Asia, including Hasselblad .
Most of the camera business has closed down in 2021.

References

External links

Business services companies established in 1906
1906 establishments in China